CrossRidge Center is a mixed-use development located in Indian Land, South Carolina. Development of the site can be traced back to 2003, when discussions first began. A major phase of development was announced in 2018.

Development
In 2003, the Lancaster County Economic Development Corp. began discussions to develop property in the unincorporated area called Indian Land, in that county. State relocation services were applied for, based on the fact it would provide several hundred jobs. The campus would be home to both non-profit enterprises and for-profit businesses.

In 2018, the largest YMCA was announced to be constructed on the property. It broke ground in 2019 and opened a year later.

Construction on the site began in 2019.  Architects at Perkins Eastman are providing the design.

In 2020, it was announced a new 120,000-square-foot office building would be constructed at the site. It is scheduled to be completed in December 2021.

Tenants
 INSP
 YMCA
 CrossRidge Cafe 
 CrossRidge Conference and Event Center

External links
 crossridgecenter.com

References

Buildings and structures in South Carolina